Connecticut's 139th House district is one of 151 Connecticut House of Representatives districts. It is represented by Kevin Ryan of Montville. Prior to the redistricting of 1992, the 139th district was in Norwalk.

List of representatives

See also 
 List of members of the Connecticut General Assembly from Norwalk

External links 
 Google Maps - Connecticut House Districts
 McGuirk Declares Candidacy for Third Term in State House

References

139
Montville, Connecticut